This is a list of airlines currently operating in Cambodia.

Scheduled airlines

See also 
 List of defunct airlines of Cambodia
 List of airports in Cambodia
 List of airlines

References 

 
Cambodia
Airlines
Airlines
Cambodia